Jim Brochu (born August 16, 1946) is an American actor, writer, director, and playwright. Born in Brooklyn, Brochu studied at Carnegie-Mellon University and received his B.A. from St. Francis College. His stage debut was in a production of William Shakespeare's Taming of the Shrew. A friend of Lucille Ball, he is the author of the unauthorized biography of Lucille Ball, titled Lucy in the Afternoon, and in this capacity, appeared on an episode of MythBusters.

He co-wrote the musical The Big Voice: God or Merman with Steve Schalchlin.

Brochu wrote and starred Off-Broadway in Zero Hour from 2009–2010, for which he won the Drama Desk award for Outstanding Solo Performance. Zero Hour is a one-person play about the life and career of actor and comedian Zero Mostel.

Biography

Jim Brochu is the only actor in America to win the New York Drama Desk Award, the Washington, DC Helen Hayes Award, the Los Angeles Ovation Award and the South Florida Carbonell Award as Best Actor in a Play, the play in question being Zero Hour about the actor/painter Zero Mostel.

Brochu spent much of 2008 in New York City, starring in his Off-Broadway play, The Big Voice: God or Merman? which the New York Times called, "Triumphant - a hilarious and utterly enthralling evening of musical theatre." In 2005, he was nominated by the Los Angeles Ovation Awards as Best Actor in a Musical for The Big Voice, an honor he won from both the Palm Springs Desert Star Awards and the Valley Theatre League ADA Awards. The Big Voice: God or Merman? was also given the Ovation Award as Best Musical, presented to himself and composer-partner, Steve Schalchlin, by the legendary Jerry Herman.

A native of Brooklyn, Brochu produced his first show, a charity revue featuring the Bay Ridge neighbourhood kids, at the age of thirteen and four years later was working on Broadway - selling orange drink at the back of the St. James Theatre during intermissions of Hello, Dolly! After studying drama at Carnegie-Mellon University, where one of his classmates was Stephen Schwartz, he returned to New York, got his BA in English from St. Francis College (Brooklyn) and made his Broadway debut (on stage at Town Hall) as Christopher Sly in a very bad revival of The Taming Of The Shrew. His off-Broadway credits include Berkeley Square with Christopher Reeve at the Manhattan Theatre Club, Robert Lowell's Endicott And The Red Cross at the American Place Theatre, Ephraim Kishon's Unfair To Goliath at the Cherry Lane, Skye at Lincoln Center and Frank Loesser's Greenwillow for the Equity Library Theatre.

While working as a stage actor, he appeared in two legendary television commercials - first as a dancing raisin for Post Raisin Bran and then as the "Lemon from Outer space" with Madge the Manicurist for Palmolive. His television work includes regular stints as Father James on All My Children, Judge Julius Weyburn on The Young and The Restless, Officer Jerry Chandler on Mary Hartman, Mary Hartman and the befuddled bailiff on NBC's Sirota's Court with Michael Constantine. He made his motion picture debut in The Gang That Couldn't Shoot Straight opposite another newcomer, Robert De Niro. His acting career has taken him to regional stages all over the United States, including the Washington Theatre Club in D.C., the Alliance Theatre in Atlanta, two seasons at the Goodspeed Opera House where he originated the role of Flint in Something's Afoot, Theatre Building Chicago, Stages Repertory Theatre in Houston, the Trinity Arts Center in Dallas and the DejaVu Theatre in Los Angeles where he won the Backstage West Award as Best Actor for his performance as Marvin in Robert Patrick's T-Shirts.

While playing Tevye in Fiddler on the Roof at the Waldo Astoria Dinner Theatre in Kansas City, Missouri he wrote his first play, Cookin' With Gus, which was published by Samuel French. It has since been performed across the United States and has been translated into several languages for productions around the world. A huge hit in Quebec, Canada, it was taped in French by HBO. One play led to another and soon Brochu was writing full-time. For the theatre, he has written the comedies The Lucky O'Learys with Kathleen Freeman, Fat Chance with Virginia Capers, The Lady Of The House with Rue McClanahan and the off-Broadway smash hit musical, The Last Session, which he also directed. After The Last Session'''s New York run (for which he received Drama Desk and Outer Critics Circle nominations), the show was named by the Los Angeles Times as one of the ten best plays of the 1998-1999 Los Angeles season, garnering him the Oscar Wilde Award and the GLAAD Media Award. Brochu won another Backstage West Award for his direction of the show, along with the Los Angeles Drama Critic's Circle Award as playwright.

In 1988 Brochu got a call from his idol, Lucille Ball, who had read The Lucky O'Learys and thought it would be perfect for herself and Audrey Meadows. By the time he finished writing the pilot for 20th Century Fox, however, Ball was not up to doing the project and it never developed. However, Ball and Brochu formed a close friendship that resulted in them spending almost every afternoon together until she died in 1989. Brochu chronicled Ball's life as she told it to him in his book, Lucy In The Afternoon, published by William Morrow and named as an alternate selection by The Literary Guild Book Club.

Brochu lives in New York, where, between theatrical assignments, he travels on cruise ships around the world lecturing about Broadway, Hollywood and the stars with whom he has worked.

He is a member of the Dramatists Guild, the Screen Actors Guild, Actors Equity Association and has been called by the New York Times a true "Man Of The Theatre". He has toured Zero Hour, in which he portrays Zero Mostel; one Los Angeles critic called it the best performance of the 2006 season. Zero Hour'' was also awarded the Best Play of 2006 by the L.A. Ovations. His caricature hangs on the wall of Sardi's restaurant in New York.

Selected filmography

References

External links

Official site
Plays by Brochu at doollee.com
"Jim Brochu at the Internet Off-Broadway Database listing

1946 births
Carnegie Mellon University alumni
Male actors from New York City
20th-century American dramatists and playwrights
American male stage actors
St. Francis College alumni
Living people